Gilbert Dussier (23 December 1949 – 3 January 1979) was a Luxembourgian footballer who played as a striker.

Club career
Dussier played overseas for almost all of his career, predominantly in France, but also in Germany.

He died of leukemia while under contract at Belgian side Thor Waterschei.

International career
Dussier won 39 caps for Luxembourg over a period of seven years, and scored nine goals in the process.

References

External links
 
 
 

1949 births
1979 deaths
Luxembourgian footballers
Association football forwards
Luxembourg international footballers
Ligue 1 players
2. Bundesliga players
Jeunesse Esch players
SV Röchling Völklingen players
AS Nancy Lorraine players
Lille OSC players
K. Waterschei S.V. Thor Genk players
Luxembourgian expatriate footballers
Luxembourgian expatriate sportspeople in West Germany
Expatriate footballers in West Germany
Luxembourgian expatriate sportspeople in France
Expatriate footballers in France
Luxembourgian expatriate sportspeople in Belgium
Expatriate footballers in Belgium
Deaths from leukemia
Belgian Congo people
Deaths from cancer in Belgium